Naphthomycin A is a type of naphthomycin.  It was isolated as a yellow pigment from Streptomyces collinus and it shows antibacterial, antifungal, and antitumor activities. Naphthomycins have the longest ansa aliphatic carbon chain of the ansamycin family. Biosynthetic origins of the carbon skeleton from PKS1 were investigated by feeding 13C-labeled precursors and subsequent 13C-NMR product analysis. Naphthomycin gene clusters have been cloned and sequenced to confirm involvement in biosynthesis via deletion of a 7.2kb region.  Thirty-two genes were identified in the 106kb cluster.

References 

Pigments
Antibiotics
Ansamycins